Andrea Roncato (born 7 March 1947 in Bologna) is an Italian actor, comedian and television personality.

Biography 
Andrea Roncato has a law degree from the University of Bologna and a solfège diploma from the Conservatorio Giovanni Battista Martini. He has attended several acting courses, both in Italy and in the United States.

His notoriety is mainly due to the comedy duo Gigi e Andrea with fellow comedian Gigi Sammarchi: after several television appearances they have become one of the most famous duos of Italian cinema in the 80s. They are known for their easy-going style and irreverence. Gigi e Andrea have been spokespeople for Agip Petroli and Autobianchi Y10 4WD in the 1980s. 
After gaining popularity with Sammarchi, Andrea Roncato continued his solo career starring in several films (including some Christmas comedies with Massimo Boldi and Christian De Sica) and in some television series.

From 2002 to 2008, he starred as Romanò in the television series Carabinieri on Canale 5 (7 seasons). In 2007, he was made a Knight of Malta. In 2008, he starred in the film  and in the same year he had his first book, Ti avrei voluto, published by Excelsior 1881. The following year, he participated as a contestant to Ballando con le stelle, a reality show on Rai 1 (and the Italian version of Dancing with the Stars).

Besides acting, presenting and voice-acting, Roncato is also an acting teacher. He has worked as art director in some nightclubs and at various charity events, he has been a promoter of the campaign "SOS Foca Monaca", of the campaign in Fabriano to raise awareness about dog's excrement collection, and he has been named a world ambassador for the protection of disabled children. He is a great lover of animals, especially dogs, and has managed to create a special shelter for strays. He personally owns two, a setter named Padberg and a Czechoslovakian Wolfdog, Tullio.

Private life 
In 1985, he had a two month affair with the famous porn star Moana Pozzi, whom he met on the set of I pompieri.

In 1997, he married Stefania Orlando, a presenter and television actress, but the marriage ended in divorce after just two years. Tabloids reported that his divorce was mainly due to his drug abuse.

He considers himself Roman Catholic.

Selected filmography

Film 
Qua la mano, directed by Pasquale Festa Campanile (1980)
I camionisti, directed by Flavio Mogherini (1982)
, directed by Sergio Martino (1983)
Fantozzi subisce ancora, directed by Neri Parenti (1983)
, directed by Sergio Martino (1983)
L'allenatore nel pallone, directed by Sergio Martino (1984)
, directed by Sergio Martino (1985)
I pompieri directed by Neri Parenti (1985)
Rimini Rimini, directed by Sergio Corbucci (1986)
, directed by Sergio Martino (1986)
, directed by Alberto Bevilacqua (1987)
Rimini Rimini - Un anno dopo, directed by Bruno Corbucci and Giorgio Capitani (1987)
, directed by Maurizio Lucidi (1987)
Vacanze di Natale '90, directed by Enrico Oldoini (1990)
Vacanze di Natale '91, directed by Enrico Oldoini (1991)
Ne parliamo lunedì, directed by Luciano Odorisio (1990)
Anni 90, directed by Enrico Oldoini (1992)
, directed by Sergio Martino (1993)
Anni 90: Parte II, directed by Enrico Oldoini (1993)
Gli inaffidabili, directed by Jerry Calà (1997)
Simpatici & antipatici, directed by Christian De Sica (1998)
Ricordati di me, directed by Gabriele Muccino (2003)
L'allenatore nel pallone 2, directed by Sergio Martino (2008)
, directed by Gian Luca Rossi (2008)
Il cuore grande delle ragazze, directed by Pupi Avati (2011)
, directed by Andrea Biglione (2011)
Napoletans, directed by Luigi Russo (2011)
La corona spezzata, directed by Ruben Maria Soriquez (2013)
Cornici di vita, directed by Giovanni Giordano (2015)
Odissea nell'ospizio directed by Jerry Calà (2019)
Under the Riccione Sun directed by YouNuts! (2020)

Television 
 (1984)
 (1985–1986)
Don Tonino (1987–1989)
 (1992)
, directed by Lodovico Gasparini (1995)
Mamma, mi si è depresso papà, directed by Paolo Poeti (1996)
I misteri di Cascina Vianello, directed by Gianfrancesco Lazotti (1997)
, directed by Fabio Luigi Lionello (1998)
 (2001)
, 7 seasons, directed by Raffaele Mertes, Sergio Martino, Giandomenico Trillo,  (2002–2008)
, directed by Pier Francesco Pingitore (2003)
Crimini, directed by Antonio Manetti and Marco Manetti (2006)
Il Capitano,  directed by Vittorio Sindoni (2007)
, directed by Francesco Bovino (2008)
, directed by Pupi Avati (2012)
 (2014)
 (2015)
Liberi tutti (2019)

Books

Awards 
1984 – Telegatto for 
1985 – Telegatto for Miss World
1991 – Telegatto for Sabato al Circo
2002 – Career award given to Gigi e Andrea at Festival del Cabaret by municipality of Martina Franca.
2004 – Premio Walter Chiari, awarded during the exhibition of Il Sarchiapone in Cervia
2006 – Premio Speciale for the television series Carabinieri, awarded during the Festival di Villa Basilica in Lecce
2007 – Title of Cavaliere di Malta
2008 – Premio Speciale Totò at the fourth edition of the Cabaret Festival in Pompeii

References

External links 

1947 births
Conservatorio Giovanni Battista Martini alumni
Italian male comedians
Italian male film actors
Italian male stage actors
Italian male television actors
Italian television personalities
Living people
Mass media people from Bologna
Italian Roman Catholics
Knights of Malta